The Open House is a 2018 American horror film written and directed by Matt Angel and Suzanne Coote. The film stars Dylan Minnette, Piercey Dalton, Sharif Atkins, Patricia Bethune, and Aaron Abrams. The film was released on Netflix on January 19, 2018.

Plot
A suburban father is killed after being hit by a car. Unemployed and financially unable to support herself and her teenage son Logan, his wife Naomi agrees to move into her sister's secluded mountain chalet until it sells. Upon moving into the beautiful home, Naomi and Logan encounter their elderly neighbor, Martha, who behaves strangely, and Chris, a pleasant store clerk.

During the open house days on Sunday, Naomi and Logan are required to leave the property at breakfast and return after 5 p.m. A series of strange occurrences begin. Objects are moved or disappear, the house phone rings but nobody speaks, the pilot to the hot water tank repeatedly gets shut off, and there are unexplained noises. One night, Logan sees a car idling in the driveway. Outside, he finds Martha, who behaves erratically. Martha later alludes to her deceased husband being alive despite previously claiming her husband was dead.

A repairman is called to inspect the faulty hot water tank. He reveals that Martha's husband really did die and Martha has Alzheimer's, leading to her confusion. Naomi is crushed when she finds a family photo crumpled up in the trash, and the repairman finds Logan's missing phone near the water heater, leading Naomi to believe that Logan has been messing with her. The two have a heated argument and he denies messing with her or destroying the photo. That night, it is revealed that there is someone else lurking in the home. One day, Naomi and Logan find that their home has been broken into and someone has set up a candlelit dinner on the table, but the police find nothing. Unable to afford a hotel, mother and son are forced to remain in the house.

Logan contacts Chris, who agrees to spend the night on the couch. In the middle of the night, Chris goes missing, and Logan finds him with his throat slashed in his car. An unidentified man knocks Logan unconscious, pours water over him and leaves him to the harsh winter elements while he goes after Naomi. Naomi is horrified to discover photos of her, and Logan, sleeping in their beds. She is then attacked, bound and tortured. Logan wakes and finds that all phones have had their SIM cards removed and snapped when he attempts to call 911 for help. He rushes to help his mother, but mistakes her for the intruder and stabs her. Naomi tells him to run before collapsing. The intruder easily overpowers Logan and removes his contact lenses, leaving Logan unable to see clearly.

Logan escapes into the woods and hides. He survives the freezing elements until morning. Succumbing to hypothermia, he drags himself to a stream. The intruder reveals himself, grabs Logan as he struggles and screams, and strangles him to death. As we see his lifeless  body by the  stream, the unidentified man drives towards the next open house event.

Cast  
 Dylan Minnette as Logan Wallace, Naomi’s son
 Piercey Dalton as Naomi Wallace, Logan’s mother
 Sharif Atkins as Chris
 Patricia Bethune as Martha
 Aaron Abrams as Brian Wallace, Logan's father
 Edward Olson as The Man in Black
Kathryn Beckwith as Joannie Mcallister

Release
The film was released on Netflix on January 18, 2018.

Reception 

References

External links
 

2018 films
2018 horror films
2018 horror thriller films
2010s teen horror films
American horror thriller films
American teen horror films
Films set in country houses
Films shot in California
English-language Netflix original films
American serial killer films
2010s English-language films
2010s American films